The women's 4 x 5 kilometre relay cross-country skiing competition at the 2010 Winter Olympics in Vancouver, Canada was held on 25 February at Whistler Olympic Park at 11:15 PST.

Russia was the defending Olympic champion with the team of Natalia Baranova-Masolkina, Larisa Kurkina, Yuliya Chepalova, and Yevgeniya Medvedeva-Arbuzova. Baranova-Masolikina retired following the 2006 Winter Olympics while Chepalova retired in August 2009 after testing positive for recombinant erythropoietin (EPO) doping. (She would be banned from the International Ski Federation (FIS) for two years in a decision rendered on 23 December 2009 that would run until 20 August 2011.) The defending world champions were the Finnish team of Pirjo Muranen, Virpi Kuitunen, Riitta-Liisa Roponen, and Aino-Kaisa Saarinen (The same foursome also won the event at the 2007 championships.) The last World Cup competition for this event prior to the 2010 Games took place 22 November 2009 in Beitostoelen, Norway and was won by the Swedish team of Anna Olsson, Sara Lindborg, Anna Haag, and Charlotte Kalla.

Each team used four skiers who each compete over two separate 2.5 km circuits with classical using the red circuit while freestyle using the blue circuit. The first two raced in the classical technique, and the final pair of skiers raced freestyle technique.

Results
The following are the results of the event.

Sweden's Olsson had the fastest first leg with Norway and Germany, who were using the same foursome in the starting order shown that won them silver at last year's world championships, rounding out the top three. Kowalczyk had the fastest second leg and in the classical technique, moved Poland (who would finish sixth) into the lead after the second exchange with Italy (who would finish fourth) and Norway rounding out the top three. Kalla of Sweden would have the fastest third leg and in the freestyle technique to propel her country from eighth to fifth. The top three after the third exchange was Norway, Italy, and tied for third with Germany and defending world champion Finland, who was using the same foursome in their same starting order. Norway's Bjørgen had the final anchor leg to give her team their first Olympic gold medal in this event since the 1984 Winter Olympics. Defending Olympic champion Russia, with Medvedeva (formerly Medvedeva-Abruzova) being the only returning member, finished a disappointing eighth. Meanwhile, the Swedes, winners of the last World Cup event, finished fifth with Kalla being the only returnee of the foursome that won the previous November.

See also
Cross-country skiing at the 2010 Winter Paralympics – Women's 3 x 2.5 km Relay

References

Women's cross-country skiing at the 2010 Winter Olympics
Women's 4 × 5 kilometre relay cross-country skiing at the Winter Olympics